The 1982 Rhode Island Rams football team was an American football team that represented the University of Rhode Island in the Yankee Conference during the 1982 NCAA Division I-AA football season. In their seventh season under head coach Bob Griffin, the Rams compiled a 7–4 record (2–3 against conference opponents) and finished fifth out of six teams in the conference. 

On September 19, 1980, Rhode Island defeated Maine in a game that took six overtimes to complete and was one of the longest games in college football history.

Schedule

References

Rhode Island
Rhode Island Rams football seasons
1982 in sports in Rhode Island